The 2006 Music City Bowl featured the Clemson Tigers and the Kentucky Wildcats.  Clemson entered the game with a record of 8–4 after having been ranked in the AP poll for most weeks of the season, as high as No. 10; Kentucky was 7–5 and unranked.  Clemson was favored by 10 points. Sponsored by Gaylord Hotels and Bridgestone, it was officially named the Gaylord Hotels Music City Bowl presented by Bridgestone.

Recap of game
Micah Johnson scored on a 1-yard touchdown run to give Kentucky a 7–0 lead over Clemson. Clemson quarterback Will Proctor then fired a 32-yard touchdown pass to wide receiver Durrell Barry, but the extra point missed, and Kentucky still led 7–6. Kentucky quarterback André Woodson found wide receiver DeMoreo Ford for a 70-yard touchdown pass with 2:14 left in the half to take a 14–6 lead.

In the third quarter, Woodson found Dicky Lyons, Jr. for a 24-yard touchdown pass and a 21–6 lead. In the fourth quarter, Woodson threw a 13-yard touchdown pass to Jacob Tamme for a 28–6 lead. Will Proctor threw a 17-yard touchdown pass with 7:25 left, to get within 28–12. The 2-point conversion attempt failed. With 44 seconds left, Will Proctor threw a 17-yard touchdown pass to wide receiver Aaron Kelly. The 2-point conversion attempt to Michael Palmer was good, and Clemson trailed 28–20. The onside kick was recovered by Kentucky, who ran out the clock.

References

External links
 USA Today game summary

Music City Bowl
Music City Bowl
Clemson Tigers football bowl games
Kentucky Wildcats football bowl games
December 2006 sports events in the United States
2006 in sports in Tennessee